Coe Searing Downing (April 7, 1791 – September 12, 1847) was an American judge and politician from New York.

Life
He married Rozetta J. Seaman (1796–1824), daughter of Assemblyman Henry O. Seaman (1769–1826), and their son was Thomas B. Downing MD (1812–1839).

In 1820, Downing remarried to Jerusha Havens (1791–1876), sister of Brookhaven Town Supervisor John Symes Havens (1796–1864).

He ran a tavern and livery stable.

Downing was a member of the New York State Assembly (Kings Co.) in 1830, 1831, 1832 and 1833.

He was a member of the New York State Senate (1st D.) from 1835 to 1838, sitting in the 58th, 59th, 60th and 61st New York State Legislatures.

At the time of his death, he was a justice of the Municipal Court of Brooklyn. He was buried at the Jackson Cemetery in Wantagh, New York.

Sources
 The New York Civil List compiled by Franklin Benjamin Hough (pp. 130f, 140, 209, 211ff and 271; Weed, Parsons and Co., 1858)
 Laws of the State of New York (71st Session) (1848; p. 298)
 A History of the City of Brooklyn by Henry R. Stiles (1867–70; reprinted 2007, Vol. 2, p. 51)

External links
 

1791 births
1847 deaths
Democratic Party New York (state) state senators
New York (state) Jacksonians
19th-century American politicians
People from Brooklyn
Democratic Party members of the New York State Assembly
New York (state) state court judges